Maurice de Canonge (March 18, 1894 – January 10, 1979) was a French actor and film director. He is also sometimes known by the name Maurice Cannon.

Selected filmography

Director
 Inspector Grey (1936)
 Captain Benoit (1938)
 Thérèse Martin (1939)
 The Last Metro (1945)
 Special Mission (1946)
Judicial Error (1948)
 The Two Girls (1951)
 Boum sur Paris (1953)
 The Price of Love (1955)
 Three Sailors (1957)

Actor

 La nouvelle aurore (1919) - Fric-Frac
 Les parias de l'amour (1921)
 Rapax (1922)
 Trilby (1923) - Zouzou
 Shadows of Paris (1924) - Robert, A Taxi Driver
 The Side Show of Life (1924) - Horatio Bakkus
 The Alaskan (1924) - Tautuk
 Love's Wilderness (1924) - Pierre Bazin
 Peter Pan (1924) - Cookson
 The Little French Girl (1925) - Jerry Hamble
 The Nude Woman (1926) - Rouchard
 Forbidden Hours (1928) - Minor Role (uncredited)
 L'évadée (1929) - Drackson
 Quand nous étions deux (1930) - Rouchard
 Amours viennoises (1931) - Muller
 Les quatre vagabonds (1931) - Novac
 Olive se marie (1931)
 Olive passager clandestin (1931) - Olive
 Un de la montagne (1934) - Le directeur de l'hôtel (uncredited)
 Adémaï au moyen âge (1935) - Un officier anglais
 Le coup de trois (1936) - Le marchand de poissons
 The Call of Silence (1936)
 Le grand refrain (1936)
 La bataille du feu (1949)
 Dernière heure, édition spéciale (1949) - (uncredited)
 Me and the Colonel (1958) - Hollander (uncredited)
 The Roots of Heaven (1958) - Haas
 Cervantes (1967)
 Hot Line (1968) - Director of Hotel (uncredited)
 Kill! Kill! Kill! Kill! (1971) - 1st Client (final film role)

References

Bibliography
 Dayna Oscherwitz & MaryEllen Higgins. The A to Z of French Cinema. Scarecrow Press, 2009.

External links

1894 births
1979 deaths
French film directors
French male film actors
French male silent film actors
20th-century French male actors
Actors from Toulon
Mass media people from Toulon